The Colossus Crisis is a fantasy novel by British writer Katherine Roberts, the sixth novel in The Seven Fabulous Wonders series and the sequel to The Olympic Conspiracy.

2005 British novels
British fantasy novels
Novels by Katherine Roberts
HarperCollins books